The following is a discography of production by R&B/hip-hop singer, songwriter, and record producer Akon.

1996

Akon - Operations of Nature 

 "Operations of Nature"
 "Operations of Nature (Remix)"
 "Crack Rock"

2000

Lil Zane - Young World: The Future 

 04. "What Must I Do"
 11. "What's Up"

Devyne Stephens - Un-Huh 
 Un-Huh

2001

Don Yute - Adrenalin 
 02. "This Boy Here"

2003

Don Yute - Win Lose or Draw 
 18. "Oh Mama"

2004

404 Soldierz - All Out War 
 09. "We Do" (featuring Akon)

Akon - Trouble 
 01. "Locked Up"
 02. "Trouble Nobody"
 03. "Belly Dancer (Bananza)"
 04. "Gangsta"
 05. "Ghetto"
 06. "Pot of Gold"
 07. "Show Out"
 08. "Lonely"
 09. "When the Time's Right"
 10. "Journey"
 11. "Don't Let Up"
 12. "Easy Road
 13. "Locked Up (Remix)" (featuring Styles P.)

2005

Baby Bash - Super Saucy 
 01. "Baby I'm Back" (featuring Akon)

C-Murder - The Truest Shit I Ever Said 
 05. "Won't Let Me Out" (featuring Akon)

Savage - Moonshine 
 05. "Moonshine" (featuring Akon)
 05. "Locked Up (Remix)" (Akon featuring Savage)

Miri Ben-Ari - The Hip-Hop Violinist 
 09. "Miss Melody" (featuring Akon)

Ruff Ryders - Vol. 4: The Redemption 
 09. "Stay Down" (featuring Akon)

Young Jeezy - Let's Get It: Thug Motivation 101 
 14. "Soul Survivor" (featuring Akon)

2006

The Shaggy Dog 
 09. "Big Dog"

Rick Ross - Port of Miami 
 05. "Cross That Line" (featuring Akon)

Obie Trice - Second Round's On Me 
 06. "Snitch" (featuring Akon)

Akon - Konvicted 
 01. "Shake Down"
 02. "Blown Away"
 03. "Smack That (featuring Eminem)"
 04. "I Wanna Love You" (featuring Snoop Dogg)
 05. "The Rain"
 06. "Never Took the Time"
 07. "Mama Africa"
 08. "I Can't Wait" (produced with T-Pain)
 09. "Gangsta Bop"
 10. "Tired of Runnin'"
 11. "Once in a While"
 12. "Don't Matter"
 13. "Sorry, Blame It on Me"
 14. "Rush" (featuring Kardinal Offishall)
 15. "Don't Matter (Calypso Remix)"

Snoop Dogg - Tha Blue Carpet Treatment 
 16. "I Wanna Love You" (featuring Akon)

Gwen Stefani - The Sweet Escape 
 02. "The Sweet Escape" (featuring Akon)

Shady Records - Eminem Presents: The Re-Up 
18. "Smack That (Remix)" (Akon featuring Stat Quo and Bobby Creekwater)

2007

Bone Thugs-N-Harmony - Strength & Loyalty 
 04. "I Tried" (featuring Akon)
 14. "Never Forget Me" (featuring Akon)

Zion - The Perfect Melody 
 08. "The Way She Moves" (featuring Akon)

Daddy Yankee - El Cartel: The Big Boss 
 08. "Bring It On" (featuring Akon)

Fabolous - From Nothin' to Somethin' 
 03. "Change Up" (featuring Akon)

Rasheeda - Dat Type of Gurl 
 05. "Let It Clap" (featuring Akon)

Plies - The Real Testament 
 14. "Hypnotized" (featuring Akon)

Brick & Lace - Love Is Wicked 
 01. "Get That Clear (Hold Up)"
 02. "Never Never"
 07. "Boyfriend"

Leona Lewis - Spirit 
 15. "Forgive Me"

Mario - Go! 
 12. "Do Right"

Styles P. - Super Gangster (Extraordinary Gentleman) 
 07. "Got My Eyes On You" (featuring Akon)

Wyclef Jean - Carnival Vol. II: Memoirs of an Immigrant 
 03. "Sweetest Girl (Dollar Bill)" (featuring Akon and Lil Wayne)

2008

Step Up 2: The Streets 
 04. "Hypnotized" (featuring  Akon)

Michael Jackson - Thriller 25 
 13. "Wanna Be Startin' Somethin' 2008" (with Akon)

David Banner - The Greatest Story Ever Told 
 04. "9mm/Speaker" (featuring Akon, Lil Wayne and Snoop Dogg)

Ashanti - The Declaration 
 10. "Body on Me" (featuring Nelly and Akon)

Three 6 Mafia - Last 2 Walk 
 07. "That's Right" (featuring Akon)

Kardinal Offishall - Not 4 Sale 
 14. "Due Me a Favour"

New Kids on the Block – The Block
 01. "Click Click Click"

Colby O'Donis - Colby O 
 01. "What You Got" (featuring Akon)
 05. "Don't Turn Back" (produced with Clinton Sparks)

Nelly - Brass Knuckles 
 08. "Body on Me" (featuring Ashanti and Akon)

DJ Khaled - We Global 
 03. "Out Here Grindin" (featuring Akon, Rick Ross, Plies, Lil Boosie, Ace Hood and Trick Daddy)

Sway - The Signature LP 
 04. "Silver & Gold" (featuring Akon)
 08. "Pray 4 Kaya"

T-Pain - Thr33 Ringz 
 08. "It Ain't Me" (featuring Akon & T.I.)

Akon - Freedom 
 01. "Right Now (Na Na Na)"
 02. "Beautiful"" (featuring Colby O'Donis and Kardinal Offishall)
 03. "Keep You Much Longer"
 04. "Troublemaker"
 05. "We Don't Care"
 06. "I'm So Paid" (featuring Lil Wayne and Young Jeezy)
 07. "Holla Holla" (featuring T-Pain)
 08. "Against The Grain" (featuring Ray Lavender)
 09. "Be With You"
 10. "Sunny Day" (featuring Wyclef Jean)
 11. "Birthmark"
 12. "Over The Edge"
 13. "Freedom"
 14. "Clap Again"

2009

Romeo - Get Low 
 01. "Get Low Wit It" (featuring Akon)

UGK - UGK 4 Life 
 14. "Hard as Hell" (featuring Akon)

Whitney Houston - I Look to You 
 05. "Like I Never Left" (featuring Akon)
 10. "I Got You"

Mary J. Blige - Stronger with Each Tear 
 01. "Tonight"

2010

Michael Jackson - Michael 
 01. "Hold My Hand" (featuring Akon)

2011

Natalia Kills - Perfectionist 
 "Mirrors"

Ya Boy - California Konvict 
 "Lock Down" (featuring Akon)

2012

Jeffree Star - Non-album single 
 00. "Prom Night"

Xzibit - Napalm 
 15. "Movies" (featuring Game, Crooked I, Slim the Mobster and Young De)

Estelle - All of Me 
 08. "Thank You"

2022

The Chainsmokers - So Far So Good 
07. "I Love U"

Singles produced by Akon
 2004
 "Locked Up" - (Akon)
 2005
 "Lonely" - (Akon)
 "Ghetto" - (Akon)
 "Belly Dancer (Bananza)" - (Akon)
 "Pot of Gold" - (Akon)
 "Soul Survivor" - (Young Jeezy featuring Akon)
 "Baby I'm Back" - (Baby Bash featuring Akon)
 2006
 "Snitch" - (Obie Trice featuring Akon)
 "Girls" - (Beenie Man featuring Akon)
 "I Wanna Love You" - (Akon featuring Snoop Dogg)
 "The Sweet Escape" - (Gwen Stefani featuring Akon)
 2007
 "Don't Matter" - (Akon)
 "Never Never" - (Brick & Lace)
 "I Tried" - (Bone Thugs-n-Harmony featuring Akon)
 "Get That Clear (Hold Up)" - (Brick & Lace)
 "The Way She Moves" - (Zion featuring Akon)
 "Hypnotized" - (Plies featuring Akon)
 "Losin' It" - (Rock City)
 "Boyz (Remix)" - (M.I.A. featuring Akon and Rock City)
 "Puakenikeni" - (Nicole Scherzinger featuring Brick & Lace)
 "Who the Fuck Is That?" (Dolla featuring T-Pain and Tay Dizm)
 "Do Right" - (Mario)
 "Boyfriend" - (Brick & Lace)
 2008
 "Just Dance"  - (Lady Gaga featuring Colby O'Donis, co-written by Akon) 
 "Forgive Me"  - (Leona Lewis)
 "Right Now (Na Na Na)" - (Akon)
 "Beautiful"" - (Akon featuring Colby O'Donis and Kardinal Offishall)
 "I'm So Paid" - (Akon featuring Lil Wayne and Young Jeezy)
 "We Don't Care" - (Akon)
2009
 "Bang Bang" - (Brick & Lace)
 "Club It Up" - (Brick & Lace)
 2010
 "Mirrors" - (Natalia Kills)
 "Hold My Hand" - (Michael Jackson featuring Akon)
 2011
 "Lock Down" - (Ya Boy featuring Akon)
 "Thank You" - (Estelle, written by Akon)
2012
"Prom Night"(Jefree Star)

References

External links
 
 

Production
Albums produced by Akon
Song recordings produced by Akon
Production discographies
Hip hop discographies
Discographies of American artists